Smiley Face is a 2007 American-German stoner comedy film directed and co-produced by Gregg Araki. Written by Dylan Haggerty, it stars Anna Faris as a young woman who has a series of misadventures after eating cupcakes laced with cannabis. The supporting cast includes Danny Masterson, John Krasinski, Adam Brody, Jayma Mays, Marion Ross, Jane Lynch, and Roscoe Lee Browne in his final film. Smiley Face was the ninth feature film directed by Araki.

Plot
Jane F is an unambitious young actress who enjoys smoking marijuana and lives in an LA apartment with her nerdy, somewhat disturbing roommate Steve. One day, she discovers a plate of cupcakes left by Steve for a science-fiction movie marathon, all of which she impulsively eats. She soon realizes that the cupcakes were laced with marijuana while remembering a list of things she needs to do that day, including paying the electric bill and going to an important audition.

Jane first decides to call her pot dealer Steve to buy more marijuana to bake more cupcakes using money left to her by her roommate to pay the electric bill, but she is short and still around $40 in debt to him. He threatens to take her furniture (including her prized mattress) and inform her roommate about her buying marijuana with his money if she does not pay him back by 3:00 at a hemp festival in Venice Beach.

As Jane begins making cannabis-infused butter for the cupcakes, she is distracted by a call from her agent Kyle reminding her about her audition in less than an hour. Her butter burns as she destroys her phone trying to turn off the smoke alarm. With no other options, she decides to sell her cache of government-strength marijuana to pay her dealer. Though late to her audition, she is still allowed to be seen by the casting director, though it goes poorly and Jane tries to sell her weed. Grossly offended, they contact the authorities, forcing her to flush her weed down the toilet in a panic.

Without her weed and broke, Jane begins cold-contacting various acquaintances for money, eventually reaching out to Brevin, a nerdy friend of her roommate's who is infatuated with her. Though unable to pay her immediately, Brevin promises to get her the cash she needs following an important dentist appointment.

Upon leaving, Brevin finds his car was broken into and his wallet, which was left on the dashboard, stolen. The police attempt to question Jane about it but, feeling paranoid, she flees. Seeking refuge at the home of one of her old college professors, a tutor on Marxist studies, she is invited in by his mother Shirley. Confusing her for his teaching assistant, she gives Jane a folder to take to his office.

Walking to an apartment complex across the street, she discovers the folder contains a first-edition copy of the Communist Manifesto. Failing to sell it to a resident, her behavior causes him to call the police. She flees into the back of a meat-truck, believing it will take her to Venice Beach. Later discovered by factory workers Mikey and Albert, they kindly give her a tour of the plant they work at.

After being kicked out by the foreman, Mikey agrees to drive her to Venice Beach after work. When a car accident causes a massive traffic jam, Jane leaves Mike's car and continues on foot. She is given a ride by a woman riding a motorcycle.

Jane is dismayed to arrive at the hemp festival just after it ended and is unable to find her dealer. Wandering the beach, she finds several ride tickets in the sand that allow her to board the Ferris wheel at the amusement park on Venice Beach Boardwalk.

While on the ride, she discovers Brevin, Shirley, her teacher, and the man from the apartment all looking for her below. Wanting to do the right thing and return the Communist Manifesto, she tries to get their attention, but her carriage shifts, causing her to let go of the book, which sends the pages flying. Jane is arrested and sentenced to 1500 hours of community service.

Cast
 Anna Faris as Jane F
 Roscoe Lee Browne as narrator/Himself (voice)
 Adam Brody as Steve the Dealer
 John Krasinski as Brevin
 Danny Masterson as Steve the Roommate
 Jane Lynch as Casting director
 Jayma Mays as Waiting room actress
 Jim Rash as Casting Assistant
 Marion Ross as Shirley
 Brian Posehn as Bus driver
 Rick Hoffman as Angry Face
 Joey "Coco" Diaz as Security guard
 Michael Hitchcock as Laundry room man
 John Cho as Mikey
 Danny Trejo as Albert
 Richard Riehle as Mr. Spencer
 Natashia Williams as Motorcyclist
 Carrot Top as himself
 Dave "Gruber" Allen as Hippie #1
 Dylan Haggerty as Ferris wheel attendant
 Michael Shamus Wiles as Officer Jones
 William Zabka as Prison guard

Reception
Smiley Face premiered at the 2007 Sundance Film Festival, followed by a very small theatrical release; in Los Angeles it had a week long run at the Nuart Theatre in Santa Monica. The film was released to DVD on January 8, 2008. Nathan Lee in his review for the Village Voice wrote that "...100 percent sober when I watched it, I can say with some authority that Dylan Haggerty has written an eleventh-hour candidate for the funniest movie of 2007, that Gregg Araki has directed his finest film since 1997's Nowhere, and that Faris, flawless, rocks their inspired idiot odyssey in a virtuoso comedic turn." It also toured around British cinemas in the summer of 2008 as part of the 22nd London Lesbian and Gay Film Festival.

In his review for The New York Times, Matt Zoller Seitz praised Faris' "freakishly committed performance as Jane F. [that] suggests Amy Adams’s princess from Enchanted dropped into a Cheech and Chong movie". Andrew O'Hehir wrote in his review for Salon, "Smiley Face, has a wonderful performance by Anna Faris and one of the all-time great stoner monologues in movie history". In her review for Cinematical, Monika Bartyzel wrote, "Araki's comedy gives us the best of many comedic worlds in an incessantly funny, easily-quotable serving. From discussions of Marxism to love of lasagna, Smiley Face serves it all — with some weed and a very, very stoned smile". The review of the New York Daily News states that "Not since Sean Penn's Jeff Spicoli in Fast Times at Ridgemont High has an actor so thoroughly dominated the screen while pretending to be in a chemically altered state." In the review of Los Angeles Times it is argued that "Gregg Araki's delirious "Smiley Face" is an unabashed valentine to Anna Faris, an opportunity for the actress to show that she can carry a movie composed of often hilarious nonstop misadventures. No matter how outrageously or foolishly Faris' Jane behaves, she remains blissfully appealing—such are Faris' fearless comedic skills."

However, S. James Snyder, in his review for the New York Sun, wrote, "If this is meant as a lighthearted change of pace for Mr. Araki, after Mysterious Skin, then perhaps he took things too far in the opposite direction. This isn't just light and fluffy; it floats away".

On review aggregator Rotten Tomatoes, the film has an approval rating of 66% based on 38 reviews, with an average rating of 5.8/10. The website's critical consensus reads, "Although many of the jokes have been done before, Anna Faris's bright performance and Gregg Araki's sharp direction make Smiley Face more than your average stoner comedy." On Metacritic, the film received a score of 71 based on 9 reviews, indicating "generally favorable reviews". Faris won the "Stoner of the Year" award at High Times magazine's Stony Awards, in Los Angeles, on October 13, 2007, for her role in Smiley Face.

References

External links
 
 
 
 
 

2007 films
2007 comedy films
American comedy films
2000s English-language films
Films directed by Gregg Araki
American films about cannabis
Films about drugs
American independent films
Films set in Los Angeles
Films produced by Steve Golin
Films scored by David Kitay
2007 independent films
2000s American films